A public service or service of general (economic) interest is any service intended to address specific needs pertaining to the aggregate members of a community. Public services are available to people within a government jurisdiction as provided directly through public sector agencies or via public financing to private businesses or voluntary organizations (or even as provided by family households, though terminology may differ depending on context). Other public services are undertaken on behalf of a government's residents or in the interest of its citizens. The term is associated with a social consensus (usually expressed through democratic elections) that certain services should be available to all, regardless of income, physical ability or mental acuity. Examples of such services include the fire brigade, police, air force, and paramedics (see also public service broadcasting).

Even where public services are neither publicly provided nor publicly financed, they are usually subject to regulation going beyond that applying to most economic sectors for social and political reasons. Public policy, when made in the public's interest and with its motivations, is a type of public service.

Sectors

In modern developed countries, the term "public services" (or "services of general interest") often includes:

 Courts
 Education
 Electricity
 Emergency services
 Environmental protection
 Health care
 Mail
 Military
 Public buildings
 Public libraries
 Public parks
 Public policy
 Public utilities
 Public transportation
 Social services
 State schools
 Telecommunications
 Transportation infrastructure
 Urban planning
 Waste management
 Water supply network

Implications 

Public services can be constructed, coordinated and operated in many ways or forms. They include government agencies, independent state-funded institutes, government-coordinated organizations, civil society, militaries and volunteers.

Government employees
Government agencies are not profit-oriented and their employees are often motivated differently. Studies of their work have found contrasting results including both higher levels of effort and fewer hours of work. A survey in the UK found that private sector hiring managers do not credit government experience as much as private sector experience. Public workers tend to make less in wages when adjusting for education, although that difference is reduced when benefits and hours are included. Public servants have other intangible benefits such as increased job security and high wages.

Need satisfaction and sustainability
A study concluded that public services are associated with higher human need satisfaction and lower energy requirements while contemporary forms of economic growth are linked with the opposite. Authors find that the contemporary economic system is structurally misaligned with goals of sustainable development and that to date no nation can provide decent living standards at sustainable levels of energy and resource use. They provide analysis about factors in social provisioning and assess that improving beneficial provisioning-factors and infrastructure would allow for sustainable forms of sufficient need satisfaction.

Characteristics
A public service may sometimes have the characteristics of a public good (being non-rivalrous and non-excludable), but most are services which may (according to prevailing social norms) be under-provided by the market. In most cases public services are services, i.e. they do not involve manufacturing of goods. They may be provided by local or national monopolies, especially in sectors that are natural monopolies.

They may involve outputs that are hard to attribute to specific individual effort or hard to measure in terms of key characteristics such as quality. They often require high levels of training and education. They may attract people with a public service ethos who wish to give something to the wider public or community through their work.

The process of assessing the needs of the people of an area, and then designing and securing an appropriate public service to meet those needs, is often referred to in the UK as commissioning. The commissioned services may be delivered by organisations in the public sector, private sector or third sector: when the private or third sector is involved the process of commissioning will usually be linked with a process of procurement, to determine who will provide the services, at what cost and on what terms. Commissioning is often seen as a cyclical process.

History
Governing bodies have long provided core public services. The tradition of keeping citizens secure through organized military defence dates to at least four thousand years ago.

Historical evidence of state provision of dispute resolution through a legal/justice system goes back at least as far as ancient Egypt.

A primary public service in ancient history involved ensuring the general favor of the gods through a theologically and ceremonially correct state religion.

The widespread provision of public utilities as public services in developed countries usually began in the late nineteenth century, often with the municipal development of gas and water services. Later, governments began to provide other services such as electricity and health care. In most developed countries, local or national governments continue to provide such services, the biggest exceptions being the U.S. and the UK, where private provision is arguably proportionally more significant. Nonetheless, such privately provided public services are often strongly regulated, for example (in the US) by Public Utility Commissions.

In developing countries, public services tend to be much less well developed. For example, water services might only be available to the wealthy middle class. For political reasons, the service is often subsidized, which reduces the finance potentially available for expansion to poorer communities. The United Nations Sustainable Development Goal 5 is however, a global initiative which aims to influence the provision of public services and infrastructure to marginalized demographics.

Nationalization, privatization and personalization

Nationalization

Nationalization took off following the World wars of the first half of the twentieth century. In parts of Europe, central planning was implemented in the belief that it would make production more efficient. Many public services, especially electricity, fossil fuels and public transport are products of this era. Following the Second World War, many countries also began to implement universal health care and expanded education under the funding and guidance of the state.

Privatization

There are several ways to privatize public services. A free-market corporation may be established and sold to private investors, relinquishing government control altogether. Thus it becomes a private (not public) service. Another option, used in the Nordic countries, is to establish a corporation, but keep ownership or voting power essentially in the hands of the government. For example, the Finnish state owned 49% of Kemira until 2007, the rest being owned by private investors. A 49% share did not make it a "government enterprise", but it meant that all other investors together would have to oppose the state's opinion in order to overturn the state's decisions in the shareholder's meeting. 

A regulated corporation can also acquire permits on the agreement that they fulfill certain public service duties. When a private corporation runs a natural monopoly, then the corporation is typically heavily regulated, to prevent abuse of monopoly power. Lastly, the government can buy the service on the free market. In many countries, medication is provided in this manner: the government reimburses part of the price of the medication. Also, bus traffic, electricity, healthcare and waste management are privatized in this way. One recent innovation, used in the UK increasingly as well as Australia and Canada is public-private partnerships. This involves giving a long lease to private consortia in return for partly funding infrastructure.

See also

Act of entrustment
 Certificate of public convenience and necessity
 Community service
 Good governance
 Infrastructure
 Labour Relations (Public Service) Convention, 1978
 New Public Management
 Right to Public Services legislation
 The Odisha Right to Public Services Act, 2012
 SGI Europe
 United Nations Public Service Awards
 United Nations Public Service Day
 Universal basic services

References

External links
 Municipal Services Project
 Public Services International
 Public Services International Research Unit
 Daniel Chavez (ed), Beyond the Market: The Future of Public Services, TNI Public Services Yearbook 2005/6, Transnational Institute / Public Services International Research Unit (PSIRU), February 2006
 European Centre of Enterprises with Public Participation and of Enterprises of General Economic Interest 
 Indian Public services 
 Government Jobs Alert 

Political economy
Service